Holmiella is a genus of fungi in the order Patellariales. 

The genus name of Holmiella is in honour of Kerstin Holm (b.1924), a Swedish botanist (Mycology) who was married to architect Lennart Holm (1921 -
2012) and worked at Uppsala University.

The genus was circumscribed by Orlando Petrini, Gary Joseph Samuels and Emil Müller in Ber. Schweiz. Bot. Ges. vol.89 on page 83 in 1979.

According to the GBIF it has 6 species;
 Holmiella domackae 
 Holmiella juniperi-semiglobosae 
 Holmiella junipericola 
 Holmiella macrospora 
 Holmiella sabina 
 Holmiella taurus

References

External links 
 Index Fungorum

Dothideomycetes enigmatic taxa
Dothideomycetes genera